The 1940–41 NHL season was the 24th season of the National Hockey League (NHL). Seven teams each played 48 games. The Boston Bruins were the Stanley Cup winners as they swept the Detroit Red Wings four games to none in the final series.

League business
In September 1940, International Ice Hockey Association president W. G. Hardy announced a new one-year agreement was reached with the NHL, who agreed to pay $250 for signing an amateur and another $250 if the amateur played in the NHL. NHL president Frank Calder signed the new professional-amateur agreement in October 1940. The agreement also included allowing the NHL to sign a limited number of junior age players.

Regular season
The Montreal Canadiens had hit the bottom in 1939–40, and were in financial trouble. Frank Patrick decided to become an investor and governor for the team, and Tommy Gorman was hired as general manager. He hired recently released Toronto coach Dick Irvin to run the team. One of the first things Gorman and Irvin did was scout for players, and the Canadiens came up with Johnny Quilty, Joe Benoit, Elmer Lach and defenceman Ken Reardon. Bert Gardiner would be used in goal, replacing Claude Bourque and Wilf Cude. Murph Chamberlain was bought from Toronto to bolster the offence.

Quilty and Benoit came through, as did Toe Blake, but the Habs had a long way to go, finishing sixth. Quilty won the Calder Trophy as the league's top rookie. In fact, before the season started, Coach Irvin handed a sealed envelope to a reporter of his guess who would win the Calder Trophy, and when the season ended, the reporter opened the envelope: Johnny Quilty was the choice Irvin made.

The Boston Bruins set a record 23 straight unbeaten games en route to a strong first place finish at the end of the schedule. The Rangers, finished fourth after the previous year's Stanley Cup win and Dave Kerr was not up to his usual form in goal.

Final standings

Playoffs

Playoff bracket

Quarterfinals

(3) Detroit Red Wings vs. (4) New York Rangers

(5) Chicago Black Hawks vs. (6) Montreal Canadiens

Semifinals

(1) Boston Bruins vs. (2) Toronto Maple Leafs

(3) Detroit Red Wings vs. (5) Chicago Black Hawks

Stanley Cup Finals

Awards

All-Star teams

Player statistics

Scoring leaders
Note: GP = Games played, G = Goals, A = Assists, PTS = Points, PIM = Penalties in minutes

Source: NHL

Leading goaltenders

Note: GP = Games played; Min – Minutes played; GA = Goals against; GAA = Goals against average; W = Wins; L = Losses; T = Ties; SO = Shutouts

Coaches
Boston Bruins: Cooney Weiland
Chicago Black Hawks: Paul Thompson
Detroit Red Wings: Jack Adams
Montreal Canadiens: Dick Irvin
New York Americans: Art Chapman
New York Rangers: Frank Boucher
Toronto Maple Leafs: Hap Day

Debuts
The following is a list of players of note who played their first NHL game in 1940–41 (listed with their first team, asterisk(*) marks debut in playoffs):
Max Bentley, Chicago Black Hawks
John Mariucci, Chicago Black Hawks
Joe Carveth, Detroit Red Wings
Elmer Lach, Montreal Canadiens
Ken Reardon, Montreal Canadiens
John Quilty, Montreal Canadiens
Chuck Rayner, New York Americans
Bill Juzda, New York Rangers

Last games
The following is a list of players of note that played their last game in the NHL in 1940–41 (listed with their last team):
Paul Haynes, Montreal Canadiens
Georges Mantha, Montreal Canadiens
Hooley Smith, New York Americans
Charlie Conacher, New York Americans
Dave Kerr, New York Rangers

See also 
1940-41 NHL transactions
 List of Stanley Cup champions
 1940 in sports
 1941 in sports

References 
 
 
 
 
 

Notes

External links
 Hockey Database
 NHL.com

 
1940–41 in Canadian ice hockey by league
1940–41 in American ice hockey by league